One, Two, Buckle My Shoe is a work of detective fiction by Agatha Christie first published in the United Kingdom by the Collins Crime Club in November 1940, and in the US by Dodd, Mead and Company in February 1941 under the title of The Patriotic Murders. A paperback edition in the US by Dell books in 1953 changed the title again to An Overdose of Death. The UK edition retailed at seven shillings and sixpence (7/6) while the United States edition retailed at $2.00.

The novel features both the Belgian detective Hercule Poirot, and Chief Inspector Japp. This is Japp's final novel appearance. Soon after he visits his dentist, Poirot is investigating the death of his dentist. More people are dead, and the investigation widens, as Poirot slowly finds his way to the true stories behind the murders.

At the time of publication, the novel was generally well received, as "compactly simple in narrative, with a swift course of unflagging suspense that leads to complete surprise." The author is described as the "Queen of Crime's [with] scheming ingenuity" who writes in "the most ingenious way and, as usual, produces a masterly solution." A Canadian reviewer felt that "the pace is swift and talk – curse of the English detective story – is kept to a minimum". Another review said "the plot is more ingenious than probable" while another was not pleased with her "joyless style of impartial investigation" nor this novel, "The 'full horrible details' that bring people to death are accounted of more importance than details which bring people to life." A later review by Robert Barnard in 1990 found "a fairly conventional murder mystery, beguilingly and cunningly sustained." while Christie has included characters of the politically unstable war time in which it was written, "political 'idealists', fascist movements and conservative financiers who maintain world stability."

Plot summary
Hercule Poirot is happy after his appointment with his dentist Henry Morley. He encounters former actress Mabelle Sainsbury Seale as she exits a cab outside the office. Poirot retrieves a shiny buckle for her that has fallen from her new shoe. During the dental visit, Morley tells Poirot that his secretary is away and her absence is slowing him in seeing patients. Later that day, his friend Inspector Japp informs him that Morley has been found dead, having been shot in the head, the gun in his hand. Between Poirot's appointment and Morley's death, the dentist had three patients – Mabelle, prominent banker Alistair Blunt, and a new patient, a Greek gentleman called Amberiotis. A fourth person, Howard Raikes, leaves without seeing Reilly. Raikes is an American left-wing activist who likes Jane Olivera, niece of the banker Blunt.

Amberiotis dies from an overdose of anaesthetic before Japp can interview him, leading police to the view that Morley accidentally killed him and committed suicide upon realising his mistake. Poirot does not accept this view. He knows from Morley's secretary Gladys Nevill that she had been called away by a fake telegram that day. Morley had not liked her boyfriend Frank Carter, and felt Carter did this.

Mabelle is missing after speaking with police. A month later, search turns up a body, whose face is smashed in, within a chest in the apartment of Mrs Albert Chapman, a woman who cannot be found. Poirot notes the dullness of the buckled shoes on the body, clothes like Mabelle's. Dental records reveal the body to be that of Mrs Chapman.

Blunt invites Poirot to his country house, where he meets Blunt's cousin and niece. Two attempts are made on Blunt's life; the second is thwarted by Raikes. The culprit is Carter, an assistant gardener at the house. Raikes finds Carter holding a gun, of the same make as the gun that killed Morley.

Agnes Fletcher, Morley's maid, tells Poirot that she saw Carter on the stairs to the dentist's office before Morley's death. Poirot presses Carter, now held by police, for the truth. Carter admits that while waiting to speak to Morley, he saw two men leave his office. When Carter enters the office, Morley is dead, his body cold. Carter fears that no one will believe him.

Poirot meets with Blunt and presents him with the complex truths now clear to Poirot, and listens to Blunt's explanations. The Scottish second cousin Helen Montressor is Blunt's first wife Gerda, whom he had married in secret. Blunt's second cousin of that name had died years earlier. He met Mabelle as an actress in the same company as Gerda in London. He had not divorced Gerda before he married his now-deceased and socially appropriate second wife, Rebecca Arnholt. If his bigamy were exposed, he would be disgraced, lose the fortune he inherited from Arnholt as well as the power he now has. When Mabelle recognises Blunt, she knows nothing of Blunt's present life. Mabelle mentions seeing her friend's husband to Amberiotis, whom she met by chance on her return to England. Amberiotis is a blackmailer and blackmails Blunt. Blunt then makes a plan to end the blackmail by murder.

Blunt and Gerda act jointly. The morning of the first two murders, Gerda invites Mabelle to an apartment she secured under the alias of Mrs Chapman. Gerda kills Mabelle by poison in her tea and briefly steals her identity at the dentist office. After Morley takes care of Blunt's teeth, Blunt kills him. He and Gerda move Morley's body to a side room, and he pretends to leave the office. Then Blunt acts as the dentist when Amberiotis arrives, injecting him with a fatal dose of anaesthetic. The secretary being out, Gerda changes Mabelle's records to become those of Mrs Chapman and vice versa; the double confusion is meant to mislead the police on who was murdered in Chapman's apartment. Gerda, as Mabelle, leaves. Once Amberiotis leaves, Blunt moves Morley's body back into the surgery; the scene appearing as a suicide, he leaves. Amberiotis and Blunt are the two men Carter saw leaving the dental office. The telegram to Nevill was sent by the pair, not by Carter. Gerda wore new shoes when impersonating Mabelle, as she could not fit into Mabelle's larger shoes after killing her. She put Mabelle's own older shoes on her dead body, a detail that Poirot noticed.

Blunt is calm in discussing these details of murder and false identity with Poirot, as he expects Poirot to cover for him on account of his political importance; Poirot will not do this. Gerda was being arrested as they talked, and Blunt will be arrested, no matter his public role. The three people murdered deserve justice to their murderers. Poirot meets Raikes and Olivera and tells them to enjoy their life together, asking that they allow freedom and pity within it.

Characters

 Hercule Poirot, the Belgian detective
 Chief Inspector Japp of Scotland Yard
 Henry Morley, a dentist in London who is found dead soon after Poirot visits him
 Georgina Morley, his sister, who lives with her brother in a flat above the dental office; she moves to the country after her brother dies
 Gladys Nevill, Morley's secretary
 (Martin) Alistair Blunt, a high-profile and powerful banker, with a public and a private life
 Rebecca Arnholt, wealthy and older (by 20 years) deceased wife of Alistair Blunt, who married him in England
 Julia Olivera, niece of Rebecca Arnholt, daughter of Rebecca's sister. She brought her daughter from America to London to part her from Raikes.
 Jane Olivera, daughter of Julia Olivera, Rebecca Arnholt's grand niece and in love with Raikes
 Howard Raikes, Jane Olivera's lover, a leftist political activist from America; he was a patient of Reilly who left before his appointment.
 Amberiotis, a heavy-set Greek man who is Morley's dental patient; he dies of an anaesthetic overdose at the Savoy, where he is staying.
 Mr Reginald Barnes, a dental patient of Mr Reilly and retired member of the Home Office, known to Poirot. He is also known as agent QX912 Albert Chapman.
 Mabelle Sainsbury Seale, a patient at Morley's dental practice, once an actress who is recently returned from India and her work there teaching elocution lessons.
 Frank Carter, boyfriend of Gladys, happy to have found a job
 Reilly, Morley's partner in the dental office, and a suspect in Morley's murder
 George, Poirot's manservant
 Alfred Biggs, Morley's page boy
 Agnes Fletcher, the Morley's maid
 Gerda Blunt (née Grant), Alistair Blunt's first wife who is also known as Mrs Chapman and as Helen Montressor, second cousin to Blunt

Explanation of the novel's title

The book's UK title is derived from a well-known children's nursery rhyme of the same name, and the chapters each correspond to a line of that rhyme. Other Agatha Christie books and short stories also share this naming convention, such as Hickory Dickory Dock, A Pocket Full of Rye, Five Little Pigs, How Does Your Garden Grow? and – most famously – And Then There Were None.

Major themes
This is the first of the Poirot novels to reflect the pervasive gloom of the Second World War, and is one of Christie's most overtly political novels. Frank Carter is a fascist and Howard Raikes a leftist. Mr Barnes discusses the main political forces freely with Poirot. Blunt's credentials as a champion of political and financial stability are made clear in the text. Nevertheless, given the choice between setting free a blasé triple murderer and allowing an innocent man, set up by the guilty man, to be hanged, Poirot saves Carter and lets Blunt and Gerda be arrested.

Literary significance and reception
Maurice Willson Disher in The Times Literary Supplement of 9 November 1940 was not impressed with either the novel or the genre when he said, "Possibly the reader who wants to be puzzled may be the best judge of a detective story. If so Agatha Christie wins another prize, for her new novel should satisfy his demands. But another type of reader will find it dry and colourless." He continued; "The facts are stated in a joyless style of impartial investigation; it quickens into life only when a revolting corpse is discovered. This is characteristic of Christie's school. The 'full horrible details' that bring people to death are accounted of more importance than details which bring people to life."

In The New York Times Book Review of 2 March 1941, Kay Irvin concluded, "It's a real Agatha Christie thriller: exceedingly complicated in plot, briskly and compactly simple in narrative, with a swift course of unflagging suspense that leads to complete surprise. After closing the book one may murmur, "Far-fetched", or even  "Impossible". But any such complaint will be voiced only after the story has been finished; there won't be a moment to think of such things, before."

Maurice Richardson in the 10 November 1940 issue of The Observer stated, "The Queen of Crime's scheming ingenuity has been so much praised that one is sometimes inclined to overlook the lightness of her touch. If Mrs Christie were to write about the murder of a telephone directory by a time-table the story would still be compellingly readable." He did admit that the "[f]iend's identity is perhaps less obscured than usual; motivation a trifle shaky, but clue details are brilliant."

The Scotsman of 26 December 1940 said of the book that, "Although motive is not of the obvious order, Mrs Christie deals with the mystery in the most ingenious way and, as usual, produces a masterly solution."

E R Punshon in The Guardian of 13 December 1940 summed up by saying, "Mrs Christie has to work coincidence rather hard and the plot is more ingenious than probable, since the culprit could, and certainly would, have reached his end by simpler means than murder."

An unnamed reviewer in the Toronto Daily Star of 15 March 1941 referred to the story as a "neat puzzle" having a "highly involved plot" with a "not-unforeseen solution."  The reviewer added, "the pace is swift and talk – curse of the English detective story – is kept to a minimum" and concluded by saying, "Far from usual is ... Christie's use of her thriller to expound a number of her own rather odd political opinions."

Robert Barnard wrote "It is usually said that Christie drags herself into the modern world in the 'fifties, but the books in the late 'thirties show her dipping a not-too-confident toe into the ideological conflicts of the pre-war years. Here we have political 'idealists', fascist movements and conservative financiers who maintain world stability. But behind it all is a fairly conventional murder mystery, beguilingly and cunningly sustained."

References to other works
In Part 3, x, of the novel, mention is made of Alistair Blunt's involvement in "the Herjoslovakian loan". Spelled as Herzoslovakia, this fictional country had featured prominently in The Secret of Chimneys (1925) and Poirot was there at the time of "The Stymphalean Birds", collected in The Labours of Hercules (1947).
In Part 4, i, Poirot and Chief Inspector Japp joke that a plot involving a body being "put into the Thames from a cellar in Limehouse" is "like a thriller by a lady novelist," in a reference to Hastings' adventures in Agatha Christie's own novel The Big Four.
In Part 7, iii, Poirot recollects the jewel thief, Countess Vera Rossakoff. Rossakoff, the nearest that Poirot comes to a love interest, appeared as a character in Chapter six of The Big Four (1927).
In Part 8, ii, mention is made by name of the Case of the Augean Stables. This had been first published in The Strand in March 1940 but would not be collected in book form until 1947, in The Labours of Hercules.

Adaptations

Television
The novel was adapted in 1992 for the series Agatha Christie's Poirot with David Suchet as Poirot. The adaptation is, overall, faithful to the book, but lacks certain characters such as Raikes, Reilly and Barnes. Due to the elimination of Raikes, Blunt's niece therefore has not as great a role as in the novel. The adaptation for TV has gained much praise in several countries, standing out as one of the darkest episodes of the series, in contrast to adaptations that have been lighter in tone.

Radio

The novel was adapted by Michael Bakewell for BBC Radio 4 in 2004, with John Moffatt as Poirot.

Publication history

 1940, Collins Crime Club (London), November 1940, Hardback, 256 p.
 1941, Dodd Mead and Company (New York), February 1941, Hardback, 240 p. as The Patriotic Murders
 1944, Pocket Books (New York), Paperback (Pocket number 249)
 1956, Pan Books, Paperback, 192 p. (Pan number 380)
 1959, Fontana Books (Imprint of HarperCollins), Paperback, 191 p.
 1973, Ulverscroft Large-print Edition, Hardcover, 322 p.
 2008, Poirot Facsimile Edition (Facsimile of 1940 UK First Edition), HarperCollins, 1 April 2008, Hardback, 

The book was first serialised in the US in Collier's Weekly in nine parts from 3 August (vol. 106, no 5) to 28 September 1940 (vol. 106, no. 13) under the title The Patriotic Murders with illustrations by Mario Cooper.

References

External links
One, Two, Buckle My Shoe at the official Agatha Christie website

1940 British novels
Hercule Poirot novels
Works originally published in Collier's
Novels first published in serial form
Collins Crime Club books
British novels adapted into television shows
Works about dentistry
Novels set in London